John Mathew (1849 – 1929) was an Australian Presbyterian minister and anthropologist.

John Mathew may also refer to:

John Mathew (MP) for Shaftesbury

See also

John Mathews (disambiguation)